Michael Ashkin is an American artist who makes sculptures, videos, photographs and installations depicting marginalized, desolate landscapes. He is a professor at Cornell University College of Architecture, Art, and Planning. Ashkin was a 2009 Guggenheim Fellow.

Ashkin is best known for his use of miniature scale and modest materials. He had his first solo show in 1996, and his floor sculpture called No. 49, was included in the 1997 Whitney Biennial. His work has been featured at the Andrea Rosen Gallery in New York, the Renaissance Society in Chicago, Vienna Secession, and in Documenta11 in Germany.

Ashkin authored Garden State, a book which compares the New Jersey Meadowlands to a formal garden. In 2014, A-Jump Books published Ashkin's Long Branch a book of
photographs and text documenting the destruction of a New Jersey neighborhood  and in 2018 TIS Books published a book of photographs from Berlin entitled Horizont. 2019 saw the release of were it not for from FW:Books, a book that combines photographs of the Mojave desert with sentences that begin with the book's title. 

Ashkin was born in Morristown, New Jersey in 1955, the son of Arthur Ashkin, a Nobel Prize-winning physicist.  He is also the nephew of the physicist Julius Ashkin. Before becoming an artist, he taught Arabic and received an M.A. in Middle East Languages and Cultures from Columbia University, and then worked as a computer programmer.

References

External links
  Artist Official Website
  Cornell University profile
  2009 Guggenheim Foundation Profile

1955 births
Living people
Columbia Graduate School of Arts and Sciences alumni
Cornell University faculty
People from Morristown, New Jersey